Colin Harrison (born 18 March 1946 in Pelsall) is an English former football full back. He is best remembered for his time at Walsall where he held the record for the most Football League appearances made by any one player at the club until Jimmy Walker beat it.

Career
A product of the Walsall youth system, he signed for the club on amateur terms in June 1961 before turning professional on 13 November 1963. His league debut came in September 1964 against Southend United and in his early days at the club he was employed as a Utility player before settling into the role of full back. He established himself as first choice in that position for a number of years until suffering an injury in 1979 which saw him miss all but one of the league games in the 1979-80 season though he did make two substitute appearances also. He returned for 19 league appearances the following season and made his final appearance in a game against Chesterfield in September 1981. He also acted as trainer of the reserves around this time. Harrison made in total either 467 or 473 league appearances depending on the source consulted. He left the club in 1982 and continued playing in the non-league with Rushall Olympic for a number of seasons before retiring.

Harrison's record for most Walsall appearances in all competitions was overhauled by Jimmy Walker in January 2012. As of January 2012 however he still holds the league appearances record for the club.

References

1946 births
Living people
English footballers
Association football defenders
Walsall F.C. players
English Football League players
Rushall Olympic F.C. players
People from Pelsall